This is a list of characters from the manga and anime series Ghost Sweeper Mikami.

Mikami GS Agency

 
 
 She is an attractive 25 year old exorcist using Japanese traditional methods and the president and owner of the ghost sweeping agency, Mikami GS. She uses a lightsaber-like energy sword as a spiritual weapon, exorcism charms, ofuda talismen and martial arts skills when dealing with supernatural entities. She was initially trained by the pastor father Karasu, but she was not satisfied with a life of poverty seeks to become wealthy from the success of her exorcism business. Her motto is "profit comes first", often gouging her clients for a higher fee and is stingy when it comes to paying her employees.

 
 
A 17-year-old high school student, poorly paid assistant of Mikami. His hourly wage is 250 yen per hour, but later increased to 255 yen. He likes beautiful girls and is infatuated by both Okinu and Mikami, although he will chase any attractive woman. He appears to have dormant spiritual abilities and later on in the manga, with the help of Shoryuki, Yokoshima gains various abilities of his own. He also gains the unique ability of creating balls from spiritual energy called Monju, apparently the only one in the world with this power.

  
 
 A beautiful teenage female ghost who was sacrificed over 300 years ago at the age of 15 or 16 to calm a volcanic mountain's anger. The process was unsuccessful and she became jibakurei or earthbound spirit. She first encountered Mikami and Yokoshima at the mountain's hot spring and Mikami "adopts" her to become the secretary and errand girl for Mikami's agency. Yokoshima is attracted to Okinu and she is fond of him, but they do not form a romantic relationship.  
 Later in the manga, Okinu's soul reunites with her body which was never destroyed. She begins the life of a normal teenage girl, but after temporarily losing her memory, she realizes that she is a natural necromancer with healing powers and the ability to understand a spirits' pain.

It is a  used by Mikami. In the anime the Kenki-kun acts as the narrator.

 
 An artificial soul created by the occult scientist, Doctor Shibusaba and rightful owner of his under house under the name of Shibusaba's son. In the search for a strong spiritualist whose spiritual wave matches her own, Mikami became the house's new owner, and the building has served as her agency since then.

Karasu's church
 
 
 A male Catholic priest exorcist who was expelled from the church because of his methods, he used to be both Mikamis' (mother and daughter) mentor, 45 years old. He is said to be one of the best and most powerful exorcists currently active thanks to his training on Myoushinzan, but with the progressing story, he becomes more like an advisor than a ghost sweeper. In one point of the manga it is suggested that he will become the chairman of the GS community one day.
 
 
 A 700-year-old half vampire. He's currently a teenager in his physical appearance. He is the son of Count Bloodeau (Pronounced Blado) who is said to be "cousin of the husband of Count Dracula's sister". While he is currently a disciple of Father Karasu, he used to know Karasu years before. He also goes to the same school as Yokoshima, and because of his handsome look, he's very popular with many girls, including Emi Ogasawara. His big dream is to become an Occult G Man one day, which will be granted at the end of the Manga.

Doctor Chaos' lab
 
 
 An old senile male alchemist / exorcist with a genius level intellect. Being immortal (or at least 1000 years old), he has acquired much knowledge of the supernatural. Unfortunately, he forgets something he already knows if he tries to learn something new, which leads to him constantly rereading his old books and a lot of running gags. While nearly all of the main Ghost Sweepers other than Meiko and Mikami are implied to be in a very deep financial rut, Chaos is the Ghost Sweeper whose dire financial straits is most often displayed and he is regularly pursued by his landlady for the rent. He had to loan Maria out to Mikami as collateral for a loan to build Teresa, and in an anime episode where the group entered a movie set in Japan's Edo period, he and Maria were depicted as peasants.
 
 
 A tough-fighting Gynoid and companion of Dr. Chaos, created from the image of Dr. Chaos's lover in his younger days. She is strong, fast and resistant to damage, hiding all kind of weapons in her body. She is a kind-hearted "person" who possesses a soul and the urge to serve mankind, unlike her sister Teresa. Maria acts as Dr. Chaos' main weapon, bodyguard and housekeeper.
 
 
 The second android Chaos invented, though relying more on modern technology than magic. This might also be the reason she regards the humanity as a failure and even tried to conquer mankind. Through the clash with her sister Maria, she sunk into the ocean and her body has never been found.

Ogasawara GS Agency
 
 
 A 29 years old dark-skinned female voodoo exorcist and chief competitor to Mikami's ghost sweeping business. According to Mikami, Emi is the strongest voodoo user worth competing with her and has three muscular assistants: Arnold, Schwarze and Negger. Even though they are competitors, they can rely on each other in times of emergency. Emi is apparently in love with Pietro de Bloodeau and uses any opportunity she can get to approach him.
 Unlike Mikami, Emi had a way darker past: she lost both her parents at the age of 10 and made a living as an assassin until the age of 15 when she gave up that career due to an incident.
 
 A large, muscular man, who is hired by Emi to defeat Mikami. After his failure, he stays as Emi's disciple and assistant. Tiger used to be a woman chaser just like Yokoshima and was nicknamed "molesting tiger", but he now has a fear of women. His has the ability to create illusions through telepathy.

Rokudou family
 
 
 An innocent-looking but extremely powerful female who directly controls 12 Shikigami, which are named after the Japanese names of the Twelve Heavenly Generals, legendary Hindu figures who became Buddhists: (Indara, Ajira, Kubira, Basara, Shindara, Sanchira, Haira, Makora, Shôtora, Anchira, Bikara, and Mekira). They're in animal form, caricatures of the symbols that these figures carry, which come from the Chinese counting series Earthly Branches. Normally they are under control, but whenever Meiko becomes distraught, her "pets" destroy anything or anyone within their reach. Unfortunately for all, Meiko is sensitive, weak-willed and easily hurt, therefore the Shikigami are set on the loose very frequently. She regards Reiko as her closest friend because she was the only person to ever talk to her and was able to calm Meiko down when she first lost control of her shikigami in public. Although she acts and looks younger than Mikami, she is actually older (her mother was shown to be pregnant with her before Mikami's mother even met her husband).
 
 
 The current mistress of the Rokudō mansion, and the former master of the Shikigami, she is still able to control them at will. She used to be both Mikami Michie's and Karasu's mentor, and after retiring from the GS business, she now runs the Rokudou Girl High school, a school for female elite spiritualists.

Occult G Men
 
 Mikami Michie's only known disciple, 28 years old. He traveled abroad to England in order to enhance his abilities, and is currently working as an Occult G Man in Japan. He is Mikami Reiko's first love, and even though they have been separated for 10 years, he still has feelings for her. Even though he claims to fight for justice, his methods are sometimes very dirty, making him a hypocrite.

 
 Mikami's mother, a first class GS who is in fact one of the strongest GS of all time, 39 years old. Her ability to time travel and absorb lightning might be due to her inherited powers from both of her parents, who used to be first class GS. Additionally she absorbed part of her husband's psychic ability and the power of a demon. At the age of 18, she became the apprentice of Karasu for a short period of time. With a very strong sense of justice, she believes that evil will never prevail, which is why she became a ghost sweeper in the first place.

Other members of Yokoshima's family
 
 Yokoshima's father, and a Casanova just like him. But unlike his son, Daishuu is very popular with women. He is shown to have incredible power for a regular person, and even manages to beat up spirits bare handed, which might be an explanation of the origin of Yokoshima's high spiritual power.
 
 Yokoshima's mother. She used to work in the same company as Daishuu as his supervisor, but in the end she fell in love with him and married him. This puts her in a similar situation as Mikami currently, who is also showing feelings towards her subordinate.

Other members of Mikami's family
 
 Mikami's younger sister, who was given birth after the Ashtaroth incident. She possesses strong pyrokinetic abilities and is most likely to surpass her sister one day. Because her power is uncontrollable, it has to be sealed for as long as she cannot handle it.
 
 Mikami's father, who is currently employed as a university professor, specialized in doing animal research abroad. Due to an accident, he gained an unmatchable telepathy ability he cannot control, only with Mikami Michie's help, they were able to weaken it so he can live a normal life. The two got married soon afterwards.

Other spiritualists
 
 A strong spiritualist and battle freak who mistakes everyone for his mother, who died when he was a child. It is implied that he is even poorer than Yokoshima because he always spends his entire money on training and travelling. He first served as Medusa's henchman, but later left their group and became an ally of Yokoshima. His technique is the demonic art "Masoujutsu", where he creates an armor to enhance his basic abilities.
 
 Student of the Rodudou Girls' school class 1-B, Okinu's classmate and the first friend Okinu made on her first school day. Used to be a delinquent girl, who has always been looking up to Yumi, even though they don't get along well. She's the brute strength type of fighter.
 
 The class representative of 1-B, a very serious person. Because of her tough training as a child, she's developed a strong urge for success, at cost of her classmates.
 
 Keeper of the restaurant Marin and an ingenious witch. A very honest and direct person, which is why she doesn't get along with Mikami. She used to study medieval arts in England together with Saijou, recovering long lost spells. At night, she works as an exorcist, who doesn't rely on heavy equipment like the rest of the GS, instead she sticks to her "Principle of balance and tidiness", on which Mikami seriously doubts.
 
 Formerly known as "Kinmō hakumen kyuubi no yōko", she used to be a nine-tailed demon fox living in the royal palace during the Yuujō period. After her unjustified execution, she has now been reborn as a fox girl simply known as Tamamo. Though she cannot remember much of her past life, she still possesses various abilities of her fox self. To help her integrate into human society, Mikami has adopted her.
 
 A young girl of the Jinrō (wolf people) tribe — though at times she acts more like a dog than a wolf — she is energetic and cheerful. Impressed by Yokoshima's "Hand of Glory", she became his apprentice, in order to avenge her father's death. After her revenge, she stayed as Yokoshima's disciple (always refers to him as "sensei"), and is planning to become a GS one day. After the main event, Shiro came back to the agency and is now officially part of Mikami's GS agency.

Gods
 
 
 A female warrior of the dragon god race who owns a training center in spiritual martial arts on top of a sacred mountain, Myoushinzan. She helped in unlocking Yokoshima's latent spiritual skills and increasing Mikami's power to her limits. Even though her power is immense, she cannot fight outside of her mountain for longer than 3 minutes, creating a parody of the live action show "Ultraman" as Yokoshima stated in one chapter.
 
 Shoryuki's master and the ruler of the sky. As the protector god of Hinduism "Hanuman", he is one of the most powerful gods in existence. He helped in further developing Mikami's, Yokoshima's and Yukinojou's abilities.
 
 A dragon goddess, and Shoryuki's friend. With her 100 visual organs, nothing can escape her eyes (or so she claims), yet her enemies manage to fool her vision more than once. She is the inspector of the god's realm, responsible for investigations.
 
 
 A renegade of the Dragon god's race and one of the top 5 wanted criminal on the black list, who vowed herself to Ashtaroth. She possesses equally strong powers to Shoryuki (or even stronger, since Shoryuki lost to her twice), and is able to summon her familiars (called "Big Eaters") at will. She dies during the siege on the moon by Yokoshima and Mikami's hand.

Demons
 
 One of the few top class arch demon of Makai, on the same level as Satan himself. He is the main villain of this manga, and Mikami's arch nemesis. Ashtaroth's plan was to control the world using the "Cosmo Processor", which lets him gain control over the boundaries of life and death, freely arranging the molecular structure of everything. When Mikami and company destroyed the device, the raging Ashtaroth tried to destroy the human world, but in the end he lost against Yokoshima's true power. It is later revealed that Ashtaroth was only trying to defy his fate as a 'villain' and was seeking for death, but was unable to because of the balance problem.
 
 Mikami Reiko's past life, a low class demon Ashtaroth created. She fell in love with the mystic Takashima (Yokoshima's past life), and stole Ashtaroth's energy crystal. After Takashima's death, she became human, resulting in the energy crystal to be bound to her soul and inherited to Mikami Reiko.
 
 A living Dogū, and one of Ashtaroth's loyal servants. He is the one who created Luciola, Vespa and Papilio.
 
 All three of Ashtaroth's servants have been granted with incredibly strong powers as compensation for their short lifespan. Luciola is the oldest of the three demon sisters, her origin is a firefly, thus her name luciola. Even though she is dedicated to fulfill Ashtaroth's will, she falls in love with Yokoshima and is willing to sacrifice everything, including her life, for his sake. Her prior ability is to control the light to create illusions. She dies but, due to her spiritual union with Yokoshima, it is decided that she will reborn as his child in the future.
 
 Luciola's younger sister, her origin is a wasp. She is the kind of direct and sincere person, thus her fighting style is solely based on brute strength and speed to compensate her lack of special abilities. It is implied that she is in love with Ashtaroth. After his death, she joined the demon army.
 
 The youngest of the three sisters, her origin is a butterfly. Being the youngest, she is very playful, and likes to raise pets. Her ability is to create a barrier with her familiars. After Ashtaroth's fall, she became a disciple of Shoryuki.

Others
 
 
 He is the owner of a store that deals with many magical items. He is very greedy and will often overprice his wares if he has the chance.
 
 
 A yōkai of an old desk housing in Yokoshima's school, her only interest lies in getting to know the school life. Her catchphrase is "the spring of youth". In one chapter of the Manga it's implied that she's secretly in love with Yokoshima, who has a natural charm towards everything supernatural.
 
 Due to the influence of Binboukami (god of poverty), she and her mother have been suffering poverty their entire life. With the help of Yokoshima however, they managed to turn the Binboukami into a god of luck, ending their demise. She also has feelings for Yokoshima, and is even willing to marry him.

References

Ghost Sweeper Mikami